Symbient is an EP by Heather Duby, released on August 21, 2001 through Sub Pop.

Track listing

Personnel 
Musicians
Heather Duby – vocals
Charlie Quintana – drums
Production and additional personnel
Ed Brooks – mastering
Steve Fisk – production, engineering, programming
John Goodmanson – mixing
Jesse LeDoux – design
Reggie Watts – production

References 

2001 EPs
Albums produced by Steve Fisk
Heather Duby albums
Sub Pop EPs